Suvra Mukherjee (17 September 1940 – 18 August 2015) was the First Lady of India serving from the year 2012 until her death in 2015.

Early and personal life
Mukherjee was born on 17 September 1940 in Jessore District of  Bengal Presidency (now in Bangladesh ), and moved to Calcutta when she was 10 years old. She married Pranab Mukherjee on 13 July 1957 and the couple had two sons and a daughter. She held two master's degrees, in history and in political science and also taught history and English grammar during the early 1970s in West Midnapore.

Mukherjee, was an accomplished singer and a vocalist of songs composed by Rabindranath Tagore, which are known as Rabindra Sangeet. She performed in his dance-dramas for many years in India, Europe, Asia and Africa, as well as being the founder of the Geetanjali Troupe, whose mission is to disseminate Tagore's philosophy through song and dance. The group often rehearsed in her home on Talkatora Road. She passed on her love of classical dance to her daughter, Sharmistha Mukherjee, with whom she also occasionally performed. She was also a painter who participated in both group and solo exhibitions.

Mukherjee authored two books: Chokher Aloey is a personal account of her close interaction with Prime Minister Indira Gandhi, and Chena Achenai Chin is a travelogue recounting her visit to China. She also supported singer Kumar Sanu and released many of his musical albums related Rabindra Sangeet and religious music.

Death 
Mukherjee died in a hospital in New Delhi, India, aged 74. She had respiratory problems and was treated as a heart patient.

Narendra Modi, the Prime Minister of India said: "... (she) will be remembered as a lover of art, culture and music. Her warm nature endeared her to everyone she met". Her friend, Sheikh Hasina, the Prime Minister of Bangladesh who attended the funeral stated: "Bangladesh has lost a great friend and well-wisher with her passing away".

References

Bibliography

1940 births
2015 deaths
Singers from Kolkata
First ladies and gentlemen of India
People from Jessore District
Indian women classical singers
Women musicians from West Bengal
20th-century Indian singers
20th-century Indian women singers
Women in West Bengal politics
Politicians from Kolkata